Jeffrey Jay Tolle is the senior pastor and founder of Citylife Church www.citylifela.org, a new church in the City of Los Angeles located in the community of North Hollywood.  He is also the former youth pastor at La Iglesia En El Camino, which belongs to the International Church of the Foursquare Gospel (as is his wife, Evelyn Tolle). He is also the founder of Eleva. a Christian youth conference.

Biography
Tolle attended Los Angeles Baptist High School, where he served as the school’s ASB spiritual life chairman his senior year. After graduating in 1997, Tolle continued his education, receiving a bachelor's degree in music education from California State University, Northridge in 2001, where he was also a swimmer. He earned his master's degree in intercultural studies at Biola University.  He was ordained as a minister in the Foursquare denomination in 2008.  Married to Evelyn in 2002, together they have four children.

See also
Jim Tolle
Jack Hayford

References

External links
CityLife Church Official Church Website
Iglesia Ciudad de Vida Official Church Website
La Iglesia En El Camino Official Church Website
The Church on the Way Official Church Website
Revolución Juvenil This is the youth group that Pastor Jeff Tolle founded

Members of the Foursquare Church
Living people
American evangelicals
American evangelists
American podcasters
Year of birth missing (living people)